Dimitrie Paciurea (2 November (1873 or 1875) – 14 July 1932) was a Romanian sculptor. His representational and symbolic style contrasts strongly to the more abstract style of his contemporary and co-national Constantin Brâncuși.

Born in Bucharest, he studied at the National School of Fine Arts in Bucharest (1890–1894), and later in Paris (1896–1900). 

In 1909 he was named professor at the National School of Fine Arts. 
Paciurea was one of the founders of the Romanian Art Society (1919). 
His students include Cornel Medrea, Ion Jalea, and Oscar Han. 
A room of the Romanian National Art Museum is devoted largely to his Chimera sculptures.

Birthdate 
Dimitrie's birth year is uncertain:
 Oscar Han, Sculptorul Dimitrie Paciurea, Bucharest, 1935, p. 7, gives Paciurea's birth year as 1875. 
 George Oprescu, Sculptura Româneasca, Bucharest, 1965, p. 93, lists 1875
 Ion Frunzetti, Paciurea, Bucharest, 1971, p. 12, date of birth as 2 November 1873. 
 Mircea Deac, Paciurea, Bucharest, 2000, p. 5, date of birth as 2 November 1873.

References

External links 

 ici.ro website
 Highbeam research paper

Romanian sculptors
Artists from Bucharest
Burials at Bellu Cemetery
Members of the Romanian Academy elected posthumously
1870s births
1932 deaths
20th-century sculptors
Bucharest National University of Arts alumni
Academic staff of the Bucharest National University of Arts